Amason is a Swedish musical band made up of vocalist Amanda Bergman (also known as Hajen, Jaw Lesson, and Idiot Wind); guitarist, keyboardist, and vocalist Gustav Ejstes (from Dungen); keyboardist Pontus Winnberg (from Miike Snow and Bloodshy & Avant); drummer Nils Törnqvist (from Little Majorette); and bassist Petter Winnberg (from Little Majorette).

Amason was formed in December 2012 and released their self-titled EP in August 2013, via Stockholm-based label Ingrid. In January 2015, the band issued their debut album, Sky City, with lyrics in both English and Swedish. In October of the same year, they released their second EP, Flygplatsen, with songs in Swedish exclusively. In 2016, they published the EP California Airport Love, which includes the English version of "Flygplatsen" as well as a cover of Foreigner's "I Want to Know What Love Is" and The Mamas & the Papas' "California Dreamin".

Sky City won the Grammis (Swedish Grammys) for Album of the Year. The band was also nominated for Artist of the Year, Pop of the Year, Lyricist of the Year, Composer of the Year, and New Artist of the Year at the same awards ceremony. The following year, their video for "I Want to Know What Love Is", directed by Filip Nilsson, was nominated for a Grammis for Video of the Year.

Band members
 Amanda Bergman – vocals, keyboard
 Gustav Ejstes – vocals, guitar, keyboard
 Pontus Winnberg – keyboard
 Nils Törnqvist – drums
 Petter Winnberg – bass

Discography
Studio albums

EPs
 EP (2013)
 Flygplatsen (2015)
 California Airport Love (2016)

Singles
 "Margins" (2013)
 "Went to War" (2013)
 "Ålen" (2013)
 "Duvan" (2014)

References

Swedish indie pop groups
Musical quintets
Musical groups established in 2013
2013 establishments in Sweden
Swedish-language singers